Moskovsky Rail Terminal may refer to:

Moskovsky Rail Terminal (Nizhny Novgorod), a rail terminal in Nizhny Novgorod, Russia
Moskovsky Rail Terminal (Saint Petersburg), a rail terminal in St. Petersburg, Russia
Moskovsky Rail Terminal (Tula)

See also
Moscow railway station (disambiguation)